Maximilian Weiler (25 September 1900 – 1 September 1969) was a Swiss footballer who played as a defender. He played for SC Veltheim and Grasshopper Club Zürich, and also represented Switzerland at international level. He won 37 caps for his country, scoring two goals, and was part of Switzerland's 1934 FIFA World Cup squad.

After retiring from his playing career, he managed FC Schaffhausen between 1942 and 1947.

References

1900 births
1969 deaths
People from Winterthur
Swiss men's footballers
Association football defenders
FC Winterthur players
Grasshopper Club Zürich players
Switzerland international footballers
Swiss football managers
1934 FIFA World Cup players
Sportspeople from the canton of Zürich